Mohammad Reza Hosseini is an Iranian footballer who currently plays for Iranian football club Gol Gohar in the Persian Gulf Pro League

Club career

Fajr Sepasi
He started his career Shahrdari Noorabad Mamasani F.C.. In January 2012, after scoring in friendly match between Shahrdari Noorabad Mamasani F.C. & Fajr Sepasi, Mahmoud Yavari, The Boss of Fajr Sepasi, approved him. After few days he joined Fajr Sepasi.

Zob Ahan
On 5 July 2015 he joined Zob Ahan with a three seasons contract which keep him until end of 2017–18 season with Isfahani side.
Hosseini was named as the best player from Zob Ahan  in the Navad site with a score of 2.77 in the 2017-18 season.

Club career statistics

Honours
Zob Ahan
Hazfi Cup (1): 2015–16
Iranian Super Cup (1): 2016

References

External links
 Seyed Mohammad Reza Hosseini at PersianLeague.com

Living people
Persian Gulf Pro League players
Azadegan League players
Fajr Sepasi players
Zob Ahan Esfahan F.C. players
Iranian footballers
1989 births
Sportspeople from Fars province
Association football midfielders